Uliana Nikolayevna Nigmatullina (née Kaisheva, ; born 8 March 1994) is a Russian biathlete. She is the only biathlete to win the four gold medals (individual, sprint, pursuit and relay) at the Youth World Championships, in 2013. She competed in the 2018 Winter Olympics.

Biathlon results
All results are sourced from the International Biathlon Union.

Olympic Games
2 medals (1 silver, 1 bronze)

World Championships

References

External links
 

1994 births
Living people
People from Mozhga
Biathletes at the 2012 Winter Youth Olympics
Biathletes at the 2018 Winter Olympics
Biathletes at the 2022 Winter Olympics
Medalists at the 2022 Winter Olympics
Russian female biathletes
Olympic biathletes of Russia
Olympic silver medalists for the Russian Olympic Committee athletes
Olympic bronze medalists for the Russian Olympic Committee athletes
Olympic medalists in biathlon
Youth Olympic gold medalists for Russia
Sportspeople from Udmurtia
20th-century Russian women
21st-century Russian women